John David Herbert (September 8, 1930 – March 27, 2017) was an American lawyer who served two terms as the 40th Ohio State Treasurer from 1963 to 1971.

A Republican, he was the son of Thomas J. Herbert, who was Governor of Ohio from 1947 to 1949.

In 1970, Herbert won the Republican nomination for Ohio Attorney General, but lost because of his connections to the "Crofters" scandal in which Republicans were accused of steering state investments to campaign contributors. The scandal brought down nearly the entire Republican ticket in 1970 and helped to elect John J. Gilligan to a single term as governor.

Herbert was born in Columbus, Ohio. His father was Thomas J. Herbert who served as Governor of Ohio. He graduated from Culver Military Academy. He then graduated from Princeton University and received his law degree from University of Michigan Law School. He served in the United States Army during Korean conflict. Herbert worked in the office of the Ohio Attorney General as an assistant. From 1973 to 1961, Herbert served as the Ohio State Treasurer and was a Republican. He lived in Cincinnati, Ohio. After he left the office of the Ohio State Treasurer, Herbert was corporate counsel to the Ace Doran Hauling and Rigging Company in Cincinnati. Herbert died at his home in Cincinnati, Ohio.

References

External links
History of Ohio Treasury

1930 births
2017 deaths
Culver Academies alumni
Ohio lawyers
Ohio Republicans
Politicians from Cincinnati
Politicians from Columbus, Ohio
Princeton University alumni
State treasurers of Ohio
University of Michigan Law School alumni
20th-century American lawyers